The Thelotremataceae are a family of lichenized fungi in the order Ostropales.

Genera
Acanthotrema
Chapsa
Chroodiscus
Diploschistes
Fibrillithecis
Gyrotrema
Ingvariella
Leptotrema
Leucodecton
Melanotrema
Myriotrema
Nadvornikia
Ocellularia (synonymous with Ampliotrema)
Phaeotrema (placement uncertain)
Platygrapha
Polistroma
Pseudoramonia
Redingeria
Reimnitzia
Stegobolus
Thelotrema
Topeliopsis
Tremotylium

External links
Outline of Ascomycota 2007

Ostropales
Lichen families
Lecanoromycetes families